Lauren O'Reilly (born 4 April 1989) is a Canadian retired volleyball player. She was part of the Canada women's national volleyball team at the 2010 FIVB Volleyball Women's World Championship in Japan. She played with Trinity Western University.

Clubs
 Trinity Western University (2010)

References

1989 births
Living people
Canadian women's volleyball players
Place of birth missing (living people)
Trinity Western Spartans players